Gerald Wilcox (born July 8, 1966) is a former slotback who played nine seasons in the Canadian Football League for three teams. Wilcox was the winner of the CFL's Most Outstanding Canadian Award in 1994 while playing for the Winnipeg Blue Bombers and also was a CFL All-Star that season.

External links 
https://web.archive.org/web/20091021215854/http://geocities.com/cfl_historical/Wilcox.G.htm

1966 births
Living people
Calgary Stampeders players
Canadian Football League Most Outstanding Canadian Award winners
Canadian football slotbacks
English players of Canadian football
Ottawa Rough Riders players
Weber State Wildcats football players
Winnipeg Blue Bombers players